Zinc transporter 8 (ZNT8) is a protein that in humans is encoded by the SLC30A8 gene. ZNT8 is a zinc transporter related to insulin secretion in humans.  Certain alleles of the SLC30A8 gene may increase the risk for developing type 2 diabetes, but a loss-of-function mutation appears to greatly reduce the risk of diabetes.

Clinical significance

Association with type 2 diabetes (T2D)
Twelve rare variants in SLC30A8 have been identified through the sequencing or genotyping of approximately 150,000 individuals from 5 different ancestry groups. SLC30A8 contains a common variant (p.Trp325Arg), which is associated with T2D risk and levels of glucose and proinsulin. Individuals carrying protein-truncating variants collectively had 65% reduced risk of T2D. Additionally, non-diabetic individuals from Iceland harboring a frameshift variant p. Lys34Serfs*50 demonstrated reduced glucose levels. Earlier functional studies of SLC30A8 suggested that reduced zinc transport increased T2D risk. Conversely, loss-of-function mutations in humans indicate that SLC30A8 haploinsufficiency protects against T2D. Therefore, ZnT8 inhibition can serve as a therapeutic strategy in preventing T2D.

See also
 Solute carrier family

References

Further reading

External links
Type 2 diabetes genes mapped out, BBC News article

Solute carrier family